Melanomyza is a genus of flies in the family Lauxaniidae. There are about 12 described species in Melanomyza.

Species
These 12 species belong to the genus Melanomyza:

 Melanomyza aliena Malloch
 Melanomyza femoralis (Loew, 1861)
 Melanomyza floridensis (Curran, 1942)
 Melanomyza gracilipes (Loew, 1861)
 Melanomyza incongrua Malloch
 Melanomyza intermedia (Malloch, 1923)
 Melanomyza laleratis Malloch
 Melanomyza manuleata (Loew, 1861)
 Melanomyza nubecula Malloch, 1926
 Melanomyza scutellata (Malloch, 1923)
 Melanomyza signatifrons (Coquillett, 1904)
 Melanomyza tenicornis Malloch, 1927

References

Further reading

 

Lauxaniidae
Articles created by Qbugbot
Lauxanioidea genera